"She's Not Just a Pretty Face" is a song recorded by Canadian country-pop singer Shania Twain. It was the fourth country single, and sixth overall, from her fourth studio album Up!. The song was written by Twain and her then-husband Robert John "Mutt" Lange. Twain had announced that "Nah!" would be the next single after "Forever and for Always", but "She's Not Just a Pretty Face" was released instead. It became Twain's 15th top ten single on Billboard Country. The song was originally to be released to the UK as a pop single on March 24, 2004, but that plan was canceled. It was, however, released to Eastern Europe as the fourth single, where it did reasonably well in some countries. The song debuted in North America on October 6, 2003. It was nominated for Best Female Country Vocal Performance at the 2005 Grammy Awards. The song was performed on highly rated TV shows, such as The Oprah Winfrey Show, the 2003 Country Music Awards, and the 2003 Billboard Music Awards, all helping it land in the top ten. Twain also performed "She's Not Just a Pretty Face" on her Up! Tour.

Composition 
The song is performed in the key of E major in common time with a tempo of 100 beats per minute.  Twain's vocals span from B3 to C5 in the song.

Critical reception
Billboard magazine called the song an "ultra-lightweight country-girl power anthem" as well as "exquisite country pop".

Music video
The music video for "She's Not Just a Pretty Face" was taken directly from Twain's 2003 Up! Live in Chicago special, filmed on July 27, 2003  and directed by Beth McCarthy-Miller. It was released on October 24, 2003 to promote the then-upcoming release of the concert DVD. The video is the first of two live videos taken from the special, the next one is "It Only Hurts When I'm Breathing". The video is available on select CD singles, and the performance can be seen on the Up! Live in Chicago DVD.

Chart performance 
"She's Not Just a Pretty Face" debuted on the Billboard Hot Country Singles & Tracks chart the week of October 11, 2003 at number 55. The single spent 20 weeks on the chart and climbed to a peak position of number nine on January 10, 2004, where it remained for one week. "She's Not Just a Pretty Face" became Twain's 15th top ten single and 20th (fifth consecutive) top 20 single. It also peaked at number 56 on the Billboard Hot 100 and Hot 100 Airplay chart.

Track listings
These are the formats for major releases.

Europe CD Maxi
"She's Not Just a Pretty Face" (Red) - 3:49
"Thank You Baby!" (Live in Chicago) - 4:01
"When You Kiss Me" (Live in Chicago) - 4:08
Enhanced: "She's Not Just a Pretty Face" (Live in Chicago) - Music Video

Europe CD Single
"She's Not Just a Pretty Face" (Red) - 3:49
"Forever And For Always" (Live in Chicago) - 4:03

Audio versions
Red Album Version (3:48)
Green Album Version (3:48)
Blue Album Version (3:39)

Charts

Weekly charts

Year-end charts

Release history

References

2003 singles
2002 songs
Shania Twain songs
Songs written by Robert John "Mutt" Lange
Song recordings produced by Robert John "Mutt" Lange
Songs written by Shania Twain
Mercury Records singles
Mercury Nashville singles
Songs with feminist themes